Ciqunan station is a subway station on the Yizhuang line of the Beijing Subway. It opened on December 30, 2010, together with the other stations on the line.

Station Layout 
The station has an underground island platform.

Exits 
There are 4 exits, lettered A, B, C, and D. Exits B and D are accessible.

References

External links

Beijing Subway stations in Tongzhou District
Railway stations in China opened in 2010